Letizia Battaglia (5 March 1935 – 13 April 2022) was an Italian photographer and photojournalist. Although her photos document a wide spectrum of Sicilian life, she is best known for her work on the Mafia.

A documentary film based on her life, Shooting the Mafia, was released in 2019.

Early life
Battaglia was born in Palermo, Sicily. At the age of 14, her father became irate when she took interest in a boy, and sent her away to boarding school. Battaglia wanted to escape and had ambitions to write. So at 16, she married Franco Stagnitta, who owned his own coffee business and came from a good family. She believed he would allow her to continue her studies, but he wanted her to be a conventional stay-at-home wife, so her writing ambition was somewhat thwarted.

Unhappy in her marriage, she eventually took another lover, though her husband shot at her when he found out. She took their daughters and moved to Milan.

Work
Battaglia took up photojournalism after her divorce in 1971, while raising three daughters. She picked up a camera when she found that she could better sell her articles if they were accompanied by photographs and slowly discovered a passion for photography. In 1974, after a period in Milan during which she met her long-time partner Franco Zecchin, she returned to Sicily to work for the left-wing L'Ora newspaper in Palermo until it was forced to close in 1992.

Battaglia took some 600,000 images as she covered the territory for the paper. She documented the ferocious internal war of the Mafia and its assault on civil society. She sometimes found herself at the scene of four or five different murders in a single day. Battaglia and Zecchin produced many of the iconic images that have come to represent Sicily and the Mafia beyond Italy. She wanted to expose and condemn the Mafia through her photography. She photographed the dead so often that she once said, "Suddenly, I had an archive of blood." She took her photographs of the dead in black and white as she believed it was more respectful, and offered its own silence.

As a result of her photographs, Battaglia spent many years fearing assassination from the Mafia. Even so, she chose not to have bodyguards. In 2017 she told The Guardian that "You no longer knew who your friends or enemies were. In the morning you came out of the house and did not know if you'd come back in the evening".

Battaglia also became involved in women's and environmental issues. For several years she stopped taking pictures and officially entered the world of politics. From 1985 to 1991 she held a seat on the Palermo city council for the Green Party, and from 1991 to 1996 she was a Deputy at the Sicilian Regional Assembly for The Network. She was instrumental in saving and reviving the historic centre of Palermo. For a time she ran a publishing house, Edizioni della Battaglia, and co-founded a monthly journal for women, Mezzocielo. She was involved in working for the rights of women and, most recently, prisoners.

In 1993, when prosecutors in Palermo indicted Giulio Andreotti, who had been Prime Minister of Italy seven times, the police searched Battaglia's archives and found two 1979 photographs of Andreotti with an important Mafioso, Nino Salvo, he had denied knowing. Aside from the accounts of turncoats, these pictures were the only physical evidence of this powerful politician's connections to the Sicilian Mafia. Battaglia herself had forgotten having taken the photograph. Its potential significance was apparent only 15 years after it was taken.

Outside of photography, her other ventures included a women's magazine, a publishing house and a photography school.

Death
Battaglia died at the age of 87 in Cefalù on April 13, 2022. She had been ill for some time.

Publications
Passion, Justice, Freedom – Photographs of Sicily. Gordonsville, VA: Aperture, 2003. .
Dovere di Cronaca - The Duty to Report., Rome: Peliti Associati, 2006. With Franco Zecchin. .
Just For Passion. Drago, 2016. .
Anthology. Drago, 2016. .

Exhibitions
Letizia Battaglia. Just For Passion, MAXXI - National Museum of the 21st Century Arts, Rome, 2016
Siciliana, Bel Vedere Fotografia, Milan, Italy
Bildmaterial der Dr.-Erich-Salomon-Preisträgerin 2007 Letizia Battaglia
Dovere di Cronaca, Festival Internazionale di Roma, 2006
Una vita per la Mafia, Orvieto Photography festival, Palazzo dei Sette, Italy, 2009
Letizia Battaglia: Breaking The Code Of Silence, Open Eye Gallery, Liverpool, UK, 2014
Cantieri Culturali alla Zisa, Palermo, Sicily, 2016
Letizia Battaglia, Vintage Prints, Galleria del Cembalo, Rome, Italy, 2022

Films
Battaglia (2004) – documentary by Daniela Zanzotto
Excellent Cadavers (2005) – documentary based on the 1995 book by Alexander Stille. Battaglia played the role of survivor and passionate eyewitness.
Palermo Shooting (2008) – by Wim Wenders; Battaglia had a cameo appearance as a photographer.
Shooting the Mafia (2019) – documentary film directed by Kim Longinotto and produced by Niamh Fagan

Awards
1985: W. Eugene Smith Grant in Humanistic Photography
1999: Photography Lifetime Achievement of the Mother Jones International Fund for Documentary Photography
2007: Dr. Erich Salomon Award, a 'lifetime achievement' award of the German Society for Photography (DGPh)
2009: Cornell Capa Infinity Award by the International Center of Photography, New York City

References

External links
 
 Testimony of a Keen Witness To Sicily's Enduring Sorrow, The New York Times, December 16, 2001

1935 births
2022 deaths
20th-century Italian women artists
21st-century Italian women artists
20th-century women photographers
21st-century women photographers
Photographers from Palermo
Italian women photographers
Italian photojournalists
Antimafia
Italian contemporary artists
Members of the Sicilian Regional Assembly
The Network (political party) politicians
Politicians from Palermo
Women photojournalists